Naraha is a rural municipality in Siraha District in Province No. 2 of south-eastern Nepal. At the time of the 2011 Nepal census it had a population of 19,369 people living.

References

External links 

 UN map of the municipalities of  Siraha District

Populated places in Siraha District
Rural municipalities of Nepal established in 2017
Rural municipalities in Madhesh Province